The 1959 California Golden Bears football team was an American football team that represented the University of California, Berkeley in the Athletic Association of Western Universities (AAWU) during the 1959 NCAA University Division football season. In their third and final year under head coach Pete Elliott, the Golden Bears compiled a 2–8 record (1–3 in AAWU, fourth), and were outscored  223 to 115.

The team's statistical leaders included Wayne Crow with 379 passing yards, Walt Arnold with 351 rushing yards, and Gael Barsotti with 111 receiving yards. Two Cal players were selected by the Associated Press (AP) for the All-Coast team: Frank Sally as a first-team tackle and Walt Arnold as a second-team fullback. Wayne Crow later played four years in the American Football League.

Schedule

Roster

References

External links
 Game program: California vs. Washington State at Spokane – September 19, 1959

California
California Golden Bears football seasons
California Golden Bears football